Leslie Ransselaer Holdridge (September 29, 1907 – June 19, 1999) was an American botanist and climatologist.  He was the father of composer Lee Holdridge as well as the father of Leslie A. Holdridge, Lorena Holdridge, Marbella Holdridge, Marly Holdridge, Marisela Holdridge, Thania Holdridge, John Holdridge, Ida Holdridge, Reuseland Holdridge, Leythy J. Holdridge and youngest son Gregory Holdridge whom he fathered with Costa Rican Clara Luz Melendez.

Career

In his famous 1947 paper, he defined "life zones" using three indicators:

 Mean annual biotemperature (average temperature, after data values below 0 °C or above 30 °C have been eliminated)
 Total annual precipitation
 The ratio of mean annual potential evapotranspiration to mean total annual precipitation.

Holdridge participated in the Cinchona Missions, a United States effort to search for natural sources of quinine during World War II.

See also 
Climate classification

References 

1907 births
1999 deaths
American climatologists
20th-century American botanists
University of Michigan School of Natural Resources and Environment alumni
People from Ledyard, Connecticut